Jordan Rhys Holt (born 4 May 1994) is a Welsh footballer.

Career
Holt was born in Frimley and began his career with Hull City's academy before he joined Scottish side St Mirren in 2012. After one year at St Mirren, he was released after he also spent time out on loan at East Stirlingshire. He joined Notts County in August 2013 following a successful trial. He made his professional debut on 29 October 2013 in a 3–2 victory over Oldham Athletic. On 15 January 2014, Notts County confirmed that Holt had left the club.

On 30 January 2014, Holt signed for Conference Premier side Gateshead. He made his debut on 8 March 2014 as a second-half substitute against Barnet. At the end of the season, Holt was released by Gateshead.

References

External links

Jordan Holt profile at UEFA.com
 https://www.uefa.com/under19/season=2013/matches/round=2000318/match=2009279/lineups/index.html?iv=true

1994 births
Living people
Welsh footballers
Association football defenders
Hull City A.F.C. players
St Mirren F.C. players
East Stirlingshire F.C. players
Notts County F.C. players
Gateshead F.C. players
English Football League players
Scottish Football League players
National League (English football) players
Wales youth international footballers